is a Japanese idol girl group, commonly abbreviated as MCZ or .

The four members of MCZ are known for energetic performances, incorporating elements of ballet, gymnastics, and action movies.

MCZ is notable for being the first female group to hold a solo concert at National Olympic Stadium in Japan, as well as providing theme music for anime television series such as Sailor Moon, Dragon Ball, and Pokémon.

In 2013, the group grossed the fourth highest total sales revenue by a music artist in Japan, with over ¥5.2 billion. During 2016, about 636,000 people attended their live concerts, the most ever for a Japanese female group. MCZ was ranked as the most popular female Japanese group from 2013 to 2018, and 2020 to 2022.

MCZ has collaborated with other performers, including a 2015 recording with American hard rock band KISS, marking KISS's first collaborative recording. In 2016, their first overseas tour titled Trans America Ultra Live was held in Hawaii, Los Angeles, and New York. They sold more than 3 million physical copies in Japan.

Members 

On stage, Momoiro Clover Z members are easily distinguished by the colors of their clothes, similar to the characters from Super Sentai or Power Rangers. In some songs and music videos, the group loosely parodies them.

Before the group made its debut, other girls were in the lineup: Sumire Fujishiro, Manami Ikura, Yukina Kashiwa (later a member of Nogizaka46), Tsukina Takai (later became a member of SKE48), Miyū Wagawa, and Runa Yumikawa.

Timeline

History

2008-2009: Conception and beginnings 
The group was formed in the spring of 2008 as a 5-member unit, originally named Momoiro Clover ("Pink Clover" or, literally, "Peach-Colored Clover"). The name was chosen to imply that the group was composed of innocent girls who wanted to bring happiness to people. Ariyasu Momoka joined the group after their first single. Later in 2011, after the departure of Akari Hayami from the group, management added the letter "Z" to the group's name.

Momoiro Clover began as a street act in 2008, performing for bystanders in Tokyo's Yoyogi Park. As most members were students attending school on weekdays, the group was active mainly on weekends, leading them to be nicknamed . In a one-year period, Momoiro Clover had a number of line-up changes. In March 2009, they became a five-member unit composed of Reni Takagi, Kanako Momota, Akari Hayami, Shiori Tamai, and Ayaka Sasaki.

To support and promote their first indie single, "Momoiro Punch", Momoiro Clover took advantage of school holidays from May to August and went by minibus on a long tour across Japan. They gave a total of 104 concerts in 24 electronic stores of the Yamada Denki network. The girls slept in the minivan, and group's managers drove. In the middle of the tour, Momoka Ariyasu was added to the group as a sixth member. The single was sold only at the group's live events and those sales were enough for it to place 11th in the Oricon Daily Singles Chart and 23rd in the weekly chart.

2010: Major debut 
In March 2010, the girls stated their goals: to take first place on Oricon, to participate in Kōhaku Uta Gassen, to perform at Budokan. They usually performed in a small club with live music or on a roof of a department store. They sometimes set a simulated stage of National Olympic Stadium, where notable musicians are allowed to perform.

Their first major-label single "Ikuze! Kaitō Shōjo" was released in May. The single debuted on Japan's Oricon Daily Singles Chart at the first position, and at number 3 for the week. Momoiro Clover then moved to King Records. The group's first single with King was "Pinky Jones", composed by Narasaki from the Japanese rock band Coaltar of the Deepers with a "more chaotic" approach than previous songs. December 24 marked Momoiro Clover's first solo concert at a concert hall. Nihon Seinenkan, a venue with a capacity of 1,300 seats, was sold out in 30 minutes.

2011: Shift to Momoiro Clover "Z"  

In January 2011 at the release event for a new song, sub-leader Akari Hayami stated that she had decided to withdraw from the group in April. Hayami explained that her character was not suited to being an idol and that her dream was to become an actress. At the April 10 Akari Hayami "graduation" concert, the group's management announced the name change to Momoiro Clover Z after Hayami's departure. In Japan,  symbolizes ultimateness and this letter is often appended to a  title (e.g., Mazinger Z and Dragon Ball Z). The band has gone on record saying in an interview that the Z in the title is a reference to the famous anime series, Dragon Ball Z stating "The Z in our name is a very obvious reference to Dragon Ball Z" and that "It's a awesome and very influential series".

Momoiro Clover Z's first single after Hayami's departure was "Z Densetsu: Owarinaki Kakumei", accompanied by a new group image and stage performance. The girls wore outfits with helmets and so-called "transformation belts" reminiscent of Japanese superhero movies, and the music video also borrowed from such "Super Sentai" imagery. In July, Momoiro Clover Z released their first album, Battle and Romance. Later in December, Hotexpress described the band as the number-one breakthrough idol artist of 2011 and stated that the album became a big turning point for them. Next February, Battle and Romance won the Grand Prix at the CD Shop Awards as the best CD of the year selected by music shop employees from all over the country. Momoiro Clover Z was the first idol group to win the award. On Christmas Day, 2011, Momoiro Clover Z gave a concert at Saitama Super Arena to their biggest audience to date: all 10,000 tickets were sold out.

2012: Rising popularity in Japan 
In May 2012, Momoiro Clover Z performed in Putrajaya, Malaysia. The former Prime Minister, Najib Razak, personally greeted the group. In June, Momoiro Clover Z opened a national tour, which closed with a sold-out show at Seibu Dome in August to a capacity crowd of 37,000 fans. Both dates were broadcast live to selected cinemas across Japan, the latter also to Taiwan and Hong Kong.

The group recorded an ending theme song for Pokémon's Best Wishes series (titled "Mite Mite Kocchichi" and included in the eighth single "Otome Sensō" as a coupling track). In July, Momoiro Clover Z performed at Japan Expo 2012 in Paris.

Momoiro Clover Z's ninth single "Saraba, Itoshiki Kanashimitachi yo", which appeared in November, topped the Billboard Japan Hot 100 chart, becoming their first single to do so.

On December 31, Momoiro Clover Z performed at Kōhaku Uta Gassen, an annual New-Year-Eve music show hosted by NHK, for the first time. Going to Kōhaku had been the group's goal for a long time.  During the January 1 Ustream broadcast, Momoiro Clover Z made several announcements: that the band set a new goal for itself — to give a concert at the National Olympic Stadium, an arena with 60–70,000 capacity, that they would release a new album in spring, and that Momoka Ariyasu had to undergo a throat treatment and she would not sing or even talk until the end of January. The treatment was subsequently prolonged for another month, until the end of February. During the group's live Ustream broadcasts, Momoka communicated by drawing and writing on a markerboard. At live performances, other members took turns in singing her parts.

2013: 5th Dimension 
Momoiro Clover Z's second full-length album 5th Dimension was released in April. It sold 180,000 copies in the first week and debuted on top of the Oricon charts, with the first album Battle and Romance resurging to number two. Finally, it won a platinum disk award. In August, Momoiro Clover Z held a concert at Nissan Stadium. It has the largest capacity in Japan.

2014: Dream come true 
In March, the group held a solo concert at National Olympic Stadium, realizing one of their dreams since the debut. Such solo concerts had only been performed by six groups until then. Momoiro Clover Z was the first female group and also became the fastest group ever, which achieved that in six years. As a two-day concert, a total of 150,000 people watched in the stadium and at live viewing venues.

In May, the group released their 11th single "Naite mo Iin Da yo"; B-side "My Dear Fellow" made its debut at Yankee Stadium when it was used for Masahiro Tanaka's warm up for his first game with the New York Yankees. The group also provided the theme music for the anime Sailor Moon Crystal. The title is "Moon Pride" (the group's 12th single released in July).

In August, the group performed at Lady Gaga's concert as an opening act. It was a part of Gaga's world tour named "ArtRave: The Artpop Ball" and held in Japan. Momoiro Clover Z was selected by Gaga herself.

2015: Collaboration with KISS 
On January 28, 2015, Momoiro Clover Z released a collaboration single with the American hard rock band KISS, titled "Yume no Ukiyo ni Saitemina". It was the first time for KISS to release a collaboration CD with another artist. In Japan, it was released physically in two versions: Momoiro Clover Z edition (CD+Blu-ray) and KISS edition (CD only). An alternate mix of the single's title song was also included as an opening track on the Japanese-only SHM-CD album Best of KISS 40, released in Japan on the same day.

In February 2015, Momoiro Clover Z were removed from a television performance due to controversy surrounding an appearance in blackface alongside Rats & Star.

Momoiro Clover Z provided the theme song, "Z no Chikai" which was released as their fifteenth single on April 29, 2015, for the Dragon Ball Z: Resurrection 'F' theatrical anime film. The group also voiced the Angels at the end of the film.

2016: Amaranthus/Hakkin no Yoake and Trans America Ultra Live 
The group released their third studio album Amaranthus and fourth studio album Hakkin no Yoake in a double release in Japan on February 17, 2016. The albums debuted at #1 and #2 in the Oricon weekly albums chart. The group held a dome trek tour for the two albums.

In early April 2016, the group announced their first overseas tour titled Trans America Ultra Live and appeared in Hawaii, Los Angeles and New York

2017: MTV Unplugged

2018: 10th Anniversary Best Album 
On January 21, Momoka Ariyasu graduated from the group, leaving MCZ with only four members. In April, they released their 18th single, "Xiao yi Xiao". On May 23, they released a new best of album for their tenth anniversary called Momo mo Juu, Bancha mo Debana.

2019–2021: Self-Titled Album 
On May 17, 2019, Momoiro Clover Z released their self-titled fifth studio album, their first studio album to not feature Momoka Ariyasu and their first as a four-member group. In 2021, they performed the theme song for the Sailor Moon Eternal movie.

2021–present: Shukuten

Music style 

The band's songs are intentionally ridiculous "hyperactive J-pop numbers". Their live performances are heavily choreographed and feature acrobatic stunts. The group is noted for their "anarchic energy" that is similar to that of punk bands. The response from the audience has been characterised as "seismic".

Some of Momoiro Clover's works are quite complex, switching from one musical style to another during one song and connecting "seemingly unconnected melodies". The group has worked with many noted songwriters and musicians, belonging to different genres of music, from pop to punk and heavy metal.  Overall, the group and its music has been noted as progressive and forward-thinking. Ian Martin from The Japan Times dubbed Momoiro Clover "a pop group who provoke squealing, teenage admiration from punks, indie kids, noise musicians and heavy-psychedelic longhairs throughout the Japanese underground music scene".  Momoiro Clover "is known for upbeat tunes, eccentric choreography and the members' costumes". A music critic from The Japan Times cites Momoiro Clover as an example of "a seamless integration of personality, image, and music, with each element mutually complementary".

Discography 

 Battle and Romance (2011)
 5th Dimension (2013)
 Amaranthus (2016)
 Hakkin no Yoake (2016)
 Momoiro Clover Z (2019)
 Shukuten (2022)

Collaboration
Momoiro Clover Z have collaborated with overseas artists.
 Kiss released a collaboration single with Momoiro Clover Z, titled "Yume no Ukiyo ni Saitemina" (January 2015).
 Lady Gaga designated Momoiro Clover Z for an opening act of  her concert (August 2014).
 Marty Friedman participated as a guitarist in "Mōretsu Uchū Kōkyōkyoku Dai 7 Gakushō "Mugen no Ai"" (March 2012) and "Moon Pride" (July 2014).
 Yngwie Malmsteen participated as a guitarist in "Mōretsu Uchū Kōkyōkyoku Dai 7 Gakushō "Mugen no Ai" -Emperor Style-" (June 2014).

The group sings the theme music for the following anime.
 Yosuga no Sora - "Pinky Jones" (November 2010)
 Dragon Crisis! - "Mirai Bowl" (January 2011)
 Bodacious Space Pirates - "Mōretsu Uchū Kōkyōkyoku Dai 7 Gakushō "Mugen no Ai‍"" (March 2012)
 Pokémon - "Mite Mite Kocchichi" (June 2012)
 Joshiraku - "Nippon Egao Hyakkei" (June 2012) in collaboration with Yoshida Brothers
 Pretty Guardian Sailor Moon Crystal - "Moon Pride",  (July 2014)
Pretty Guardian Sailor Moon Crystal Season III -  (June 2016)
Pretty Guardian Sailor Moon Eternal: The Movie -  (January 2021, with main voice actresses: Kotono Mitsuishi, Hisako Kanemoto, Rina Sato, Ami Koshimizu, and Shizuka Ito)
 Dragon Ball Z: Resurrection 'F' - "Z no Chikai (April 2015)
 Crayon Shin-chan: Burst Serving! Kung Fu Boys ~Ramen Rebellion~ - "Xiao Yi Xiao" (April 2018).

Overseas performances 
 Japan Media Arts Festival 2011 in Dortmund, Germany (September 9)
 Hari Belia Negara 2012 in Putrajaya, Malaysia (May 26)
 Japan Expo 2012 in Paris, France (July 5)
 Anime Expo 2015 in Los Angeles, California (July 2)
Japan SAKURA Festival 2016 in Hanoi, Vietnam (April 16, 17)
Bilibili Macro Link 2016 in Shanghai, China (July 23)
Trans America Ultra Live 2016 in Hawaii, Los Angeles and New York (November 15–19)

Awards 
In 2012, their first album Battle and Romance won the CD Shop Award as the best CD of the previous year as voted by music shop salesclerks from all over Japan. It was the first time an idol (group) got this prize.

|-
| style="text-align:center;"| 2012
| Battle and Romance
| CD Shop Awards — Grand Prix
| 
|-
| rowspan="4" style="text-align:center;"| 2013
| rowspan="2"| "Saraba, Itoshiki Kanashimitachi yo"
| Space Shower Music Video Awards — Special Award
| 
|-
| MTV Video Music Award Japan for Best Choreography
| 
|-
| rowspan="2"| Momoiro Clover Z
| MTV Europe Music Award for Best Japanese Act
| 
|-
| MTV Europe Music Award for Best Japan and Korea Act
| 
|-
| rowspan="2" style="text-align:center;"| 2015
| rowspan="2"| Maku ga Agaru
| 39th Japan Academy Prize — Popularity Award
| 
|-
| The 40th Hochi Film Award — Special Award
|

Filmography 
  - August 2010
Horror film. During filming, the girls were reportedly led to believe they were participating in a documentary about an urban legend and that everything happening was genuine.
  - March 2011
 Ninifuni - February 2012
  - February 2012
5-episode internet drama omnibus film.
  - February 2015
The five members played leading roles and later won Japan Academy Prize.

Notes

References

External links 

  
  
 YouTube channel (videos up to 2013; a shared channel with sister groups)
 YouTube channel (videos from 2014)
 Ustream channel

 
Japanese pop music groups
Japanese rock music groups
Japanese dance groups
Japanese idol groups
Japanese girl groups
Child musical groups
Vocal quartets
2008 establishments in Japan
Musical groups established in 2008
Musical groups from Tokyo
Stardust Promotion artists
King Records (Japan) artists
Universal Music Japan artists
MTV Europe Music Award winners